The West Indies cricket team toured Australia in the 2000–01 cricket season. They played five Test matches against Australia, and also competed in a triangular One Day International series that also involved Zimbabwe.

Test series
Australia won the Test series 5–0, the first time the West Indies had been whitewashed by Australia since the 1930–31 series.

1st Test

2nd Test

3rd Test

4th Test

5th Test

One Day series

The one day series, sponsored by Carlton & United Beverages, was played between Australia, Zimbabwe and the West Indies. The West Indies and Australia qualified for the finals, in which Australia won the first two matches in Melbourne and Sydney. Hence a deciding final match was not required.

References

 Playfair Cricket Annual
 Wisden Cricketers Almanack (annual)

External links
 CricketArchive

2000 in Australian cricket
2001 in Australian cricket
2000 in West Indian cricket
2001 in West Indian cricket
2000–01 Australian cricket season
2000-01
International cricket competitions in 2000–01